Erik Rylander (3 September 1905 – 9 September 1976) was a Swedish ski jumper. He competed in the individual event at the 1932 Winter Olympics.

References

External links
 

1905 births
1976 deaths
Swedish male ski jumpers
Olympic ski jumpers of Sweden
Ski jumpers at the 1932 Winter Olympics
People from Falun
Sportspeople from Dalarna County